Van der Weele or Van der Weel is a Dutch toponymic surname meaning "from the weel". Weel is a Zeelandic form of Dutch wiel,  a pool or small lake formed by a dyke breach. People with this name include:

 Herman Johannes van der Weele (1852–1930), Dutch painter
 Herman Willem van der Weele (1879–1910), Dutch entomologist, son of Herman Johannes
 Lilian Janse-van der Weele (born 1973), Dutch Reformed Political Party politician
 Fleur van der Weel (born 1970), Dutch illustrator
 Zoe van der Weel (born 1990), British-Norwegian handball player

See also
Van der Wiel, Dutch surname of the same origin
Van de Wiele, Belgian surname of the same origin

References

Dutch-language surnames
Dutch toponymic surnames
Surnames of Dutch origin